The Castor-class coastal patrol vessels are used by the Belgian Navy, primarily for patrols in the Belgian exclusive economic zone of the North Sea.

History 
In January 2012 Belgian Minister of Defence Pieter De Crem presented plans for the future of the navy. These plans where approved by the Belgian Government in May of that same year. Both Damen Group and Socarenam responded to an invitation to tender. Damen proposed a variant of their Stan Patrol vessel which was already in use by a number of navies. But in December 2012 an order for two ships was placed at Socarenam for a far lower price then the initial budget. Construction for the first ship began in June 2013.

Castor was delivered to the navy in 2014. She was followed by Pollux in 2015.

Ships in class

References

Ships built in France
Patrol ship classes